Serge Mimpo-Tsintsémé (born 6 February 1974) is a Cameroonian former professional footballer who played as a defensive midfielder. He also holds French citizenship.

He played on the professional level in Super League Greece for Panachaiki 2005 F.C. and Ethnikos Asteras F.C.

Honours
 Olympic champion: 2000.

References

External links
Profile at Sports-reference.com

Living people
1974 births
Association football midfielders
Cameroonian footballers
Cameroon under-20 international footballers
Super League Greece players
Championnat National players
Championnat National 2 players
Canon Yaoundé players
Panachaiki F.C. players
Ethnikos Asteras F.C. players
Paris FC players
Red Star F.C. players
FCM Aubervilliers players
Olympic footballers of Cameroon
Olympic gold medalists for Cameroon
Footballers at the 2000 Summer Olympics
Olympic medalists in football
Medalists at the 2000 Summer Olympics
Cameroonian expatriate footballers
Expatriate footballers in Greece
Cameroonian expatriate sportspeople in Greece
Cameroon international footballers